The Half Assini – New Town Rd. is a stretch of highway in Ghana's Western Region in the Jomoro District. It starts in Half Assini and ends in New Town.

Infrastructure project 
The highway is undergoing major rehabilitation after being neglected for years. The Ghanaian Government is rehabilitating part of the Half Assini - New Town road network to give the area a facelift and facilitate socio-economic activities. Dior Merkano, Jomoro District Feeder Road Engineer, told the Ghana News Agency in an interview at Half Assini on Thursday that the rehabilitation involves earthworks, concrete works and bituminous surfacing. The project started in 2008 and was scheduled to be done but a gravel shortage in the cause only 1.9 km has been completed.

Populated places in Jomoro Municipal District